Tourism in Korea may refer to:

Tourism in North Korea
Tourism in South Korea